The WWE SmackDown Women's Championship is a women's professional wrestling world championship created and promoted by the American professional wrestling promotion WWE on the SmackDown brand. Unveiled on the August 23, 2016, episode of SmackDown, it was created to be the counterpart title to the then-WWE Women's Championship, which became exclusive to Raw as a result of the 2016 WWE draft and renamed to the Raw Women's Championship.

The championship is generally contested in professional wrestling matches, in which participants execute scripted finishes rather than contend in direct competition. The inaugural champion was Becky Lynch, who won the title at Backlash on September 11, 2016. Charlotte Flair is the current champion in her record seventh reign. She won the title by defeating Ronda Rousey on the December 30, 2022, episode of SmackDown in Tampa, Florida.

Charlotte Flair has the most reigns at seven. Bayley's second reign is the longest singular reign at 380 days, while Flair's fourth reign is the shortest at less than 1 day. Bayley also holds the record for longest combined reign at 520 days. Asuka is the oldest champion at 37, while Alexa Bliss is the youngest, having won it at 25.

Title history

Combined reigns 

See also 
 Women in WWE
 Women's championships in WWE

References

External links 
 Official SmackDown Women's Title History

WWE championships lists
WWE SmackDown
WWE women's championships
Women's professional wrestling championships lists